Frida Topno (20 September 1925 – 6 February 2018) was an Indian politician from Odisha.

She was elected as member of Lok Sabha from Sundergarh in Odisha in 10th Lok Sabha in 1991 and 11th Lok Sabha in 1996 as Indian National Congress Party candidate. She died on 6 February 2018 at the age of 92.

She was elected to Upper House of India Parliament - the Rajya Sabha for the term 1998–2002 from Odisha.

References

1925 births
2018 deaths
Munda people
Rajya Sabha members from Odisha
India MPs 1991–1996
India MPs 1996–1997
Lok Sabha members from Odisha
Women in Odisha politics
People from Sundergarh district
20th-century Indian women politicians
20th-century Indian politicians
Women members of the Lok Sabha
Women members of the Rajya Sabha
Indian National Congress politicians from Odisha